Marcus Mills "Brick" Pomeroy (also known as Mark M. Pomeroy; December 25, 1833 – May 30, 1896) was an American journalist that became notorious for his anti-Lincoln sentiment during the American Civil War.

Early life
Pomeroy was born in Elmira, New York in 1833. As a young man, he worked as a printer's devil.

Career
Pomeroy established the first newspaper in Corning, New York in 1854 and then moved to Wisconsin in 1857. There he was a La Crosse, Wisconsin newspaperman, editor of the La Crosse Democrat from 1860 to 1869, then editor of Pomeroy's Democrat from 1869 to 1887 (1869 to 1879 in New York City, then in La Crosse, with branch offices in Chicago and probably elsewhere).

It was during this time that he acquired the nickname "Brick". According to one account, after he had displayed skill in writing an article, another editor said that someone that could write so well was "a perfect brick" (i.e., a good fellow). According to another account, a journalist in the eastern United States had written a series of articles about celebrities called "charcoal sketches," and Pomeroy imitated these in a more extravagant manner, describing Wisconsin personalities and dubbing his articles "brick-dust sketches."

During the American Civil War, he initially supported preservation of the Union and was commissioned as a second lieutenant in the Union forces. However, he became a Copperhead, and in an editorial he called Abraham Lincoln "fungus from the corrupt womb of bigotry and fanaticism" and a "worse tyrant and more inhuman butcher than has existed since the days of Nero.... The man who votes for Lincoln now is a traitor and murderer.... And if he is elected to misgovern for another four years, we trust some bold hand will pierce his heart with dagger point for the public good."

Pomeroy relocated to New York in 1868, and then to Chicago in 1875, also spending time in Denver before returning to New York.

In later years, he became a leader of the Greenback Party and the People's Party/Union Labor Party of Wisconsin. During the 1880s he employed African-American journalist George Edwin Taylor as city editor of Pomeroy's Democrat. It claimed to have the largest circulation of any political newspaper in the country.

Pomeroy died in Brooklyn in 1896.

Family
Pomeroy married three times; his second wife, née Louise Rider or Ryder, became a celebrated Shakespearean actor, known as Louise Pomeroy.

References

External links

1833 births
1896 deaths
19th-century American newspaper publishers (people)
American newspaper editors
Copperheads (politics)
Writers from La Crosse, Wisconsin
Wisconsin Democrats
Wisconsin Greenbacks
19th-century American politicians
Wisconsin Laborites
Journalists from Wisconsin